The 1948–49 Scottish Districts season is a record of all the rugby union matches for Scotland's district teams.

History

Glasgow District beat Edinburgh District in the Inter-City match.

South play Durham County 21 October 1948.

Results

Inter-City

Glasgow District:

Edinburgh District:

Other Scottish matches

Midlands District:

North of Scotland District: 

Rest of the West:

Glasgow District: 

North of Scotland District:

South of Scotland District: 

Provinces District:

Anglo-Scots:

Junior matches

South of Scotland District:

Edinburgh District: 

East of Scotland District:

West of Scotland District:

Trial matches

Blues Trial:

Whites Trial: 

Probables:

Possibles:

English matches

South of Scotland District:

Durham County:

International matches

No touring matches this season.

References

1948–49 in Scottish rugby union
Scottish Districts seasons